William Goldsmith is an American drummer.

William Goldsmith may also refer to:

William Goldsmith (MP for Bridgnorth) for Bridgnorth (UK Parliament constituency) in 1388
William Goldsmith alias Smith (died 1517), MP for Gloucester (UK Parliament constituency)

See also